Fucked Up Friends is the first studio album by Tobacco. It was released through Anticon on October 14, 2008. Aesop Rock provided vocals on "Dirt".

Critical reception
At Metacritic, which assigns a weighted average score out of 100 to reviews from mainstream critics, the album received an average score of 73% based on 14 reviews, indicating "generally favorable reviews".

Kevin O Donnell of Rolling Stone gave the album 3.5 stars out of 5, calling it "one of the year's best stoner-rock records." Meanwhile, Joe Colly of Pitchfork gave the album a 6.2 out of 10, saying, "as an album, Fucked Up Friends lacks focus and variety."

Jeff Weiss of LA Weekly placed it at number 46 on the "50 Best Albums of the Year" list.

Track listing

References

External links
 

2008 debut albums
Anticon albums
Tobacco (musician) albums